Ohmidani Dam is an arch dam located in Tokushima prefecture in Japan. The dam is used for power production. The catchment area of the dam is 101.3 km2. The dam impounds about 8  ha of land when full and can store 451 thousand cubic meters of water. The construction of the dam was started on 1958 and completed in 1960.

References

Dams in Tokushima Prefecture
1960 establishments in Japan